is a very small asteroid, approximately 10 meters in diameter, which is classified as near-Earth object of the Apollo group and as an Earth co-orbital asteroid.

Orbit 
During the 2011 opposition, the last opposition of  that was observed,  approached on June 2, 2011 within 0.00231 AU (346,000 km) of the Earth, which is less than 1 lunar distance. For comparison, the distance to the Moon is about 0.0026 AU (384,400 km).

With an orbital period of 369.99 days,  is in a near 1:1 orbital resonance with Earth, and also has about the same orbit around the Sun as Earth.

The Jupiter Tisserand invariant, used to distinguish different kinds of orbits, is 6.039. The orbit has a small inclination of about 0.4 degrees.

JPL includes non-gravitational acceleration parameters in the orbital solution.

Physical characteristics
Because  is a very small multi-opposition near-Earth object, the effect of radiation pressure on the orbit caused by light from the Sun was able to be detected. The radiation-related acceleration allowed the Area to Mass Ratio (AMR) to be estimated at (2.97 ± 0.33) × 10−4 m2/kg. Assuming an albedo of 0.12, a typical average for asteroids in the inner solar system, this AMR corresponds to a density of about 640 kg/m3. This density is consistent with the density of very porous rock. For comparison, the asteroid 2006 RH120 has a measured density of about 400 kg/m3, and the density of the asteroid 253 Mathilde as measured by the NEAR-Shoemaker space probe was 1300 kg/m3. In contrast, the density of the man-made near-Earth object 6Q0B44E is 15 kg/m3.

References

External links 
 
 
 

Minor planet object articles (unnumbered)
Earth-crossing asteroids

20110602
20090116